Jan Badura (20 December 1907 – 14 August 1975) was a Polish footballer. He played in two matches for the Poland national football team from 1931 to 1936.

References

External links
 

1907 births
1975 deaths
Polish footballers
Poland international footballers
Place of birth missing
Association football midfielders
Ruch Chorzów players